Nipponentomon uenoi is a species of proturan in the family Acerentomidae. It is found in Southern Asia.

Subspecies
These two subspecies belong to the species Nipponentomon uenoi:
 Nipponentomon uenoi paucisetosum ImadatÃ©, 1965
 Nipponentomon uenoi uenoi ImadatÃ© & Yosii, 1959

References

Further reading

 

Protura
Articles created by Qbugbot
Animals described in 1959